Patrick G. Carrick is a member of the Senior Executive Service and an academic.

Career
Before joining the United States Department of Defense, Carrick was assistant professor of physics at Mississippi State University and Director of the Shared Laser Facility at the University of Oregon. In 1989 he was assigned to Edwards Air Force Base to do research in rocket propulsion. He was assigned to The Pentagon in 2004. In 2007 he was named Director of Physics and Electronics of the Air Force Office of Scientific Research.  In 2014 he was assigned to the Department of Homeland Security (DHS) as deputy director of the Homeland Security Advanced Research Projects Agency (HSARPA).  He became Director of HSARPA in 2015.  In 2016 he was also assigned to be the Acting Chief Scientist for the DHS Science and Technology Directorate.  In November 2017 he became the Chief Scientist, Science and Technology Directorate at DHS.

Education
B.S., Chemistry - University of Wisconsin-Madison
Ph.D., Chemistry - Rice University
M.S., National Resource Strategy - Industrial College of the Armed Forces

References

University of Oregon faculty
Mississippi State University faculty
University of Wisconsin–Madison alumni
Rice University alumni
Dwight D. Eisenhower School for National Security and Resource Strategy alumni
Living people
American scientists
Year of birth missing (living people)